VeneSat-1, also known as Simón Bolívar (after Venezuelan independence fighter Simón Bolívar), was the first Venezuelan satellite. It was designed, built and launched by the CGWIC subsidiary of the China Aerospace Science and Technology Corporation. It was a communications satellite operating from a geosynchronous orbit. It was launched on a Chinese Long March 3B carrier rocket from Xichang Satellite Launch Center Launch Complex 2 on 29 October 2008 at 16:53 UTC.

Overview
VeneSat-1 was operated by Venezuela's Bolivarian Agency for Space Activities (ABAE). The satellite was built on the Chinese DFH-4 satellite bus. It had a payload of 14 C-band, 12 Ku-band, and 2 Ka-band transponders. The satellite occupied an orbital slot of 78° West, designated for Uruguay and ceded to Venezuela by mutual accord. The satellite provided television broadcasting and broadband connectivity services.

Since 13 March 2020, VeneSat-1 has been out of service after a series of maneuvers left it tumbling and drifting away from its assigned orbital position. Seradata reported that the satellite lost both of its solar array drives between February and March 2020, leading to a loss of power for the spacecraft. The operator attempted to perform an emergency move of the spacecraft to a graveyard orbit, but evidently, only the apogee engine burn was successful while the perigee burn failed. It is suggested that the spacecraft may have run out of power during the perigee attempt, or that it may have exhausted its fuel supply. It had also drifted west by 30°.

On 24 March 2020, the Venezuelan government switched the majority of the functions of VeneSat-1 to the American Intelsat 14. The following day, Venezuela's Ministry of Science and Technology declared that the satellite had been lost and its mission ended. VeneSat-1 failed three years before its expected end of life.

Significance 
Venezuela's work on Venesat-1 was conducted in part to amplify regional network Telesur's programming by enabling it to avoid geo-blocking efforts by DirectTV, an American company.

See also

 VRSS-1
 VRSS-2
 Media of Venezuela

References

External links
 VeneSat-1 at Bolivarian Agency for Space Activities

Communications satellites in geostationary orbit
Satellite television
Telecommunications in Venezuela
Telecommunications in the Caribbean
Telecommunications in South America
First artificial satellites of a country
Satellites of Venezuela
China–Venezuela relations
Satellites using the DFH-4 bus
Spacecraft launched by Long March rockets
2008 in Venezuela
Spacecraft launched in 2008
Spacecraft decommissioned in 2020
Derelict satellites orbiting Earth